Aldo Castellani, KCMG (8 September 1874 – 3 October 1971) was an Italian pathologist and bacteriologist.

Life and achievements

Castellani was born in Florence and educated there, qualifying in medicine in 1899. He worked for a time in Bonn and joined the School of Hygiene and Tropical Medicine in London in 1901.  As bacteriologist with the Royal Society Commission on Sleeping Sickness in 1902, he went to Entebbe, Uganda with George Carmichael Low and Cuthbert Christy. He demonstrated the cause and means of transmission of sleeping sickness, discovered the spirochete of yaws, and did other original work in bacteriology and in parasitic diseases of the skin. In 1903 he was appointed Bacteriologist to the Government of Ceylon at the Central laboratory in Colombo and continued research in mycology and bacteriology, describing several new species of intestinal bacilli. He invented the absorption test for the serological identification of closely allied organisms. He left Ceylon in 1915 for Naples where he took the Chair of Medicine. He was involved during World War I in Serbia and Macedonia as a member of the Inter-Allied Sanitary Commission.

In 1919 Castellani went to London as Consultant to the Ministry of Pensions. He became lecturer on mycology and mycotic diseases at the London School of Hygiene and Tropical Medicine, and established a consulting practice in Harley Street. He was knighted in 1928 as an Honorary  and in 1934 his daughter Jacqueline Castellani married Sir Miles Lampson.

Castellani's enthusiasm for Royal and eminent patients such as Benito Mussolini clouded his reputation and during World War II he supported Italy against the Allies, becoming chief of the Italian Army's medical service. War correspondent Alaric Jacob discovered his looted quarters in Cirene in December 1941 and was tempted to pass his correspondence to his son in law Sir Miles Lampson, then British Ambassador in Egypt.

Castellani was President of the International Society of Dermatology from 1960 to 1964, which he had founded in 1959. He was also professor of tropical medicine at the State University of Louisiana and also at the Royal University of Rome. He  followed the Queen of Italy Marie José into exile in Portugal and ended his life as Professor at Lisbon's Institute of Tropical Medicine. Castellani died in 1971. Castellani's paint (Carbol fuchsin solution) is still occasionally used to treat fungal skin infections.

The human pathogen Acanthamoeba castellanii is named after him.

Literary works 

 Manual of tropical medicine, 1910 (with Albert John Chalmers)
 Fungi and fungous diseases, 1928
 Climate and acclimatisation, 1938
 Manuale di clinica tropicale, (with Jacono)
 Microbes, Men and Monarchs: A Doctor's Life in Many Lands: The Autobiography of Aldo Castellani Victor Gollancz LTD (1963)

References

External links

 Biography on Whonamedit
 National Portrait Gallery collection
 Some places and memories related to Aldo Castellani on Himetop – The History of Medicine Topographical Database

1874 births
1971 deaths
Italian exiles
Italian monarchists
Italian pathologists
Italian bacteriologists
Italian expatriates in Portugal
Honorary Knights Commander of the Order of St Michael and St George
Physicians from Florence
Italian expatriates in the United Kingdom
Italian expatriates in British Ceylon